Maziyar Jobrani (born February 26, 1972), better known as Maz Jobrani, is an American comedian and actor who was part of the "Axis of Evil" comedy group. The group appeared on a comedy special on Comedy Central. Jobrani has also appeared in numerous films, television shows, including Better Off Ted, on radio, and in comedy clubs. His filmography includes roles in The Interpreter, Friday After Next, Dragonfly, and Jimmy Vestvood: Amerikan Hero. He appeared as a regular character on the 2017 CBS sitcom Superior Donuts. He had been an advisory board member of the National Iranian American Council (NIAC).

Early life and education
Jobrani was born in Tehran, Iran. He and his parents moved to California when he was six years old. He was raised in Tiburon in the San Francisco Bay area. He attended Redwood High School in Larkspur, and was inducted into the Redwood distinguished alumni class of 2017. Jobrani studied political science and Italian at UC Berkeley, where he received a B.A. degree. He was enrolled in a PhD program at UCLA when he decided to pursue his childhood dream of acting and performing comedy.

Career

Television and radio
Jobrani has since made appearances on shows like The Colbert Report, The Tonight Show with Jay Leno, The Late Late Show with Craig Ferguson, Talkshow with Spike Feresten, Whitney, and regularly performs at top comedy clubs (in California and New York) such as The Comedy Store. He made an appearance as a dental patient on an episode of Still Standing, in the pilot episodes of Better Off Ted, The Knights of Prosperity, on an episode of Cedric the Entertainer Presents, on an episode of Malcolm in the Middle as Robber #2 and on an episode of The West Wing as a Saudi prince. He also made appearances in 13 Going on 30 and Bug. He has toured with the Axis of Evil Comedy Tour. He provided the voice of Ahmed Farahnakian in the audiobook version of World War Z. Jobrani has written a movie with a friend called Jimmy Vestvood: Amerikan Hero.

Jobrani makes occasional appearances on NPR's news quiz show Wait Wait... Don't Tell Me! and American Public Media's Wits. He appeared on episode 118, October 28, 2010, of WTF with Marc Maron. Additionally, Jobrani co-hosts his own podcast on the All Things Comedy podcasting network with fellow comedians Al Madrigal, Chris Spencer, and Aaron Aryanpur. Titled Minivan Men, the podcast chronicles the lives and experiences of the hosts with particular focus on fatherhood.

He played Jafar in the 2015 musical fantasy television film Descendants.

In 2015, Jobrani released a memoir entitled I'm Not a Terrorist, But I've Played One On TV.

Standup style
Jobrani's jokes focus on race and the misunderstanding of Middle Easterners in America. He also talks about his family.

Social and Political activities
Jobrani had been a board member of the National Iranian American Council (NIAC).. In 2015, he stepped down after discovering NIAC's alleged ties to the Iranian government. He also sits on the board of the Persian American Cancer Institute (PACI.org) and also works with International Society for Children with Cancer (ISCC-Charity.org).

Personal life
In 2006, Jobrani married an Indian-American attorney named Pretha. They have a son and daughter and reside in California.

Mr. Jobrani has two younger brothers and an older sister.  His youngest brother is A. Joseph "Joey" Jobrani.  After that is Mr. Kashi Jobrani (b. 1977 - d. 2014) who died when he was 36.  His older sister, Director/Producer Mariam Jobrani (b. 1969 - d. 2017) died at the age of 47 from metastatic breast cancer.

Stand up specials
 2007 Axis of Evil Comedy Special
 2009 Brown & Friendly
 2013 I Come in Peace
 2015 I'm Not a Terrorist, But I've Played One On TV
 2017 Immigrant

Books

See also
 Iranian stand-up comedy
 Axis of Evil Comedy Tour

References

External links
 
 
 
 
 Interview and photos
 Maz Jobrani speaks out about Democracy for Iranians
 Interview with SanDiego.com, 2/14/2011
 Maz Jobrani speaks about the immigrant experience for an Iranian-American

21st-century American comedians
American stand-up comedians
American comedians of Iranian descent
American male comedians
American male actors
Iranian emigrants to the United States
People from Tiburon, California
People from Tehran
University of California, Berkeley alumni
University of California, Los Angeles alumni
Comedians from California
1972 births
Living people
Redwood High School (Larkspur, California) alumni